Jeffrey G. "Jeff" Holguin (born October 24, 1978, in Fullerton, California) is an American sport shooter. He placed fourth in the double trap at the 2008 Summer Olympics.

Records

References

1978 births
Living people
American male sport shooters
United States Distinguished Marksman
Trap and double trap shooters
Olympic shooters of the United States
Shooters at the 2008 Summer Olympics
Pan American Games medalists in shooting
Pan American Games gold medalists for the United States
Pan American Games silver medalists for the United States
Shooters at the 2003 Pan American Games
20th-century American people
21st-century American people